Stocking Lake is a lake in Hubbard County, in the U.S. state of Minnesota.

Stocking Lake was so named on account of its outline being in the shape of a stocking.

See also
List of lakes in Minnesota

References

Lakes of Minnesota
Lakes of Hubbard County, Minnesota